Dantzig (Also known as Dantzic or Danzick) was a small town on the tip of the Burin Peninsula in Newfoundland and Labrador. It was likely named after the city of Gdańsk in Poland. The population was reported as 29 in the 1869 census. The population had declined to just two families in 1928 and the town was abandoned soon after.

See also
List of communities in Newfoundland and Labrador
List of ghost towns in Newfoundland and Labrador

References 

Ghost towns in Newfoundland and Labrador